Zineb Sedira (born April 1st, 1963) is a London-based Franco-Algerian feminist photographer and video artist, best known for work exploring the human relationship to geography.

Sedira was shortlisted for the 2021 Deutsche Börse Photography Foundation Prize.

Early life and education
Zineb Sedira was born on April 1st, 1963 to Abdul Rahman Sedira and Oumessaad Rouabah, immigrants from Algeria, in the Parisian suburb of Gennevilliers. She moved to England in 1986.

Sedira received a BA in Critical Fine Art Practice at London's Central Saint Martins, then earned an MFA from the Slade School of Fine Art in 1997. She later spent five years doing research at the Royal College of Art.

Career
Sedira's early work focused on images of women in the Muslim world, featuring photographs of her mother and her daughter. Watching her mother don the haik upon arrival in Algiers had a significant impact on Sedira. "I remember as soon as we got off the plane and arrived at her home, she would open the case and put it out," she said in 2013. "She would change into it. She would become it." Her video, Mother Tongue (2002) shows herself, her daughter, and her mother speaking in their "mother tongues", French, English, and Arabic respectively, with Sedira acting as the linguistic conduit between her mother and her daughter who don't have a language in common. In September 2020 it was announced that Sedira will represent France at the 59th Venice Biennale, in 2022. She created an installation named “dreams have no titles” where she converted the French pavilion into a film studio and a screening room paying tribute to the 1960s and 1970s militant films and referencing also to her own family’s history as immigrants in France.

Exhibitions
2004: Zineb Sedira: Telling stories with differences, Cornerhouse, Manchester, UK
2005: British Art Show 06, opening at Baltic, Gateshead, touring to Manchester, Nottingham and Bristol.
2006: Saphir, The Photographers' Gallery, London
2007: Saphir, Temble Bar Gallery, Dublin, Ireland 
2007: Videos by Zineb Sedira, Centre d'Art Contemporain du Parvis, Pau, France 
2008: MiddleSea, The Wapping Project, London
2009: Floating Coffins, New Art Exchange, Nottingham, UK
2009: Zineb Sedira: Seafaring, John Hansard Gallery, Southampton, UK
2009: Under the Sky and Over the Sea, Pori Art Museum, Finland 
2010: Zineb Sedira, La Guerre et la Paix, Vallauris, France
2010: Gardiennes d'images, Palais de Tokyo, Paris
2011: Beneath the Surface, Galerie Kamel Mennour, Paris 
2013: The Voyage, or Three Years at Sea Part V: Zineb Sedira, Charles H. Scott Gallery, Vancouver, Canada
2016: Collecting Lines, Art on the Underground, London
2018: Of Words and Stones, curated by Marie Muracciole at the Beirut Art Center, Lebanon
2018: Zineb Sedira: Air Affairs and Maritime Nonsense, Sharjah Art Museum, Sharjah, United Arab Emirates. A retrospective.

Collections
Sedira's work is held in the following public collections:
 Arts Council Collection, UK: 1 print (as of July 2021)
 Centre Pompidou, Musée national d'art moderne, Paris: 7 prints (as of July 2021)
 Musée national de l'histoire et des cultures de l'immigration / Cité nationale de l'histoire, Paris: 1 video installation, "Mother Tongue" (as of July 2021)
 Sharjah Art Museum, Sharjah, United Arab Emirates
 Tate, London: 2 works (as of July 2021)
 Mumok, Museumsquartier, Vienna: 1 work, "The House of the Mother (Algeria)" (as of July 2021)
 Victoria and Albert Museum, Contemporary Wall Paper Collections, London: 1 work, "Une Generation des Femmes" (as of July 2021)
 Whitworth Art Gallery, Contemporary Wall Paper Collections, Manchester: 1 work, "Une Generation des Femmes" (as of July 2021)

Awards
1999  Artsadmin Artists Bursary, London & Artists film and video national fund, The Arts Council of England
2000  Westminster Arts Council, Film and Video Bursaries, London
2001  Prix AfAA, Laureat 2001: IV Rencontres de la photographie africaine, Bamako 2001, Mali 
2004  Decibel Award, Arts Council, London 
2009: SAM Art Prize, Paris
2021: Shortlisted, Deutsche Börse Photography Foundation Prize, London for the exhibition Standing Here Wondering Which Way to Go at Jeu de Paume, Paris in 2019; along with Poulomi Basu, Alejandro Cartagena and Cao Fei

References

Further reading 

“Zineb Sedira in conversation with Christine Van Assche,” Zineb Sedira, Saphir (Paris: Kamel Mennour & Paris Musées, 2006), 58–59.
Richard Dyer, “Saphir,” Zineb Sedira: The Photographer's Gallery (London: Kamel Mennour & Paris Musées, 2006).
Isabelle Perbal, “Entretien Zineb Sedira, Retour aux origins,” Qantara, October 2008.

External links

 

1963 births
Living people
20th-century Algerian artists
21st-century Algerian artists
20th-century French artists
21st-century French artists
20th-century French women artists
21st-century French women artists
Algerian women artists
Alumni of Central Saint Martins
Alumni of the Slade School of Fine Art
Alumni of the Royal College of Art
Artists from Paris
People from Gennevilliers
French video artists
Women video artists